The following is the qualification system and qualified countries for the Bowling at the 2019 Pan American Games competitions.

Qualification system
A total of 64 bowlers will qualify to compete. Each nation may enter a maximum of 4 athletes (four per gender). In each gender there will be a total of 16 pairs qualified, with one spot per event (so a total of four bowlers) reserved for the host nation Peru. There will be a total of five qualification events. Each nation could only enter two qualification events per gender.

Qualification timeline

Qualification summary

Men

Women

References

B
B
Qualification for the 2019 Pan American Games
Bowling at the 2019 Pan American Games